The Krupp K5  was a heavy railway gun used by Germany throughout World War II.

Description
This gondola was then mounted on a pair of 12-wheel bogies designed to be operated on commercial and military rails built to German standards. This mounting permitted only two degrees of horizontal traverse. The carriage had to be aligned on the rails first, with only minimal fine leveling capable once halted. Hence the gun could only fire at targets tangential to an existing railway track.

To track targets needing greater traverse either a curved length of railway was used with the gun shunted backwards or forwards to aim; a cross-track was laid with the front bogie turned perpendicular to the rest of the gun and moved up and down the cross-track to train the weapon; or for 360 degree traverse, the "Vögele Turntable" could be constructed, consisting of a raised rail section (the "firing bed") carrying the gun, running on a circular track with a central jack to raise the gun during traverse and to take some of the enormous weight.

History
The K5 was the result of a crash program launched in the 1930s to develop a force of railway guns to support the Wehrmacht by 1939. K5 development began in 1934 with first testing following in 1936 at Darlowo (German: Schießplatz Rügenwalde-Bad) in the former Farther Pomerania at the South coast of the Baltic Sea. Initial tests were done with a 150 mm barrel under the designation K5M.

Production led to eight guns being in service for the Invasion of France, although problems were encountered with barrel splitting and rectified with changes to the rifling. The guns were then reliable until the end of the war, under the designation K5 Tiefzug 7 mm. Three were installed on the English Channel coast and were intended to target British shipping in the Channel, but proved unsuccessful.

Two K5 guns, named Robert and Leopold by German crews, were shipped to Italy to help counter the Allied landing at the town of Anzio in February 1944. The Allied soldiers stuck on the beach nicknamed the two German guns "Anzio Annie" and "Anzio Express" due to the express train-like sound the shells generated. On 18 May 1944 the guns fired off their remaining ammunition and then escaped along the coastal railroad into the rail yard in Civitavecchia, in preparation for evacuation. This proved impossible and the guns were destroyed by their crews.

Towards the end of the war, development was done to allow the K5 to fire rocket-assisted projectiles to increase range. Successful implementation was done for firing these from the K5Vz.

A final experiment was to bore out two of the weapons to  smoothbore to allow firing of the Peenemünder Pfeilgeschosse arrow shells. The two modified weapons were designated K5 Glatt.

Several other proposals were made to modify or create new models of the K5 which never saw production. In particular, there were plans for a model which could leave the railway by use of specially modified Tiger II tank chassis which would support the mounting box in much the same manner as the railway weapon's two bogies. This project was ended by the defeat of Germany.

Projectiles
Two types of high explosive projectile were used with the K5. The 28cm Gr.39 m. Hbgr. These projectiles were pre-rifled with angled splines along their midsection which were aligned with the guns rifling before firing.

The rocket assisted projectile was known as the 28cm R. GR.4351. When the rocket burnt out the center section containing the rocket motor fell away and the projectile continued on its course. The maximum range for this projectile was  but due to the weight of the rocket motor the projectile carried less explosives.

Surviving guns
A K5(E) is preserved at the United States Army Ordnance Museum in Fort Lee (Petersburg, Virginia). Leopold was shipped to the United States Aberdeen Proving Ground, (Aberdeen, Maryland) where it underwent tests and evaluations. In early 2011 it was moved to Fort Lee, Virginia as a result of the 2005 Base Relocation and Closure (BRAC) Act.

The guns were discovered on a railroad siding in the town of Civitavecchia, on 7 June 1944, shortly after the allies had liberated Rome. Robert had been partially destroyed by the gun crew before they surrendered and Leopold was also damaged, but not as badly.

A second surviving gun can be seen at the Batterie Todt museum, near Audinghen in northern France.()

Photo gallery

See also
 Big Bertha (howitzer)
 M65 Atomic Annie gun
 Paris Gun
 Schwerer Gustav
 List of the largest cannons by caliber

Notes and references
Notes

References

 
 Ulrich Ziervogel: Der Schießplatz in Rügenwalde-Bad, in: Der Kreis Schlawe - Ein pommersches Heimatbuch (M. Vollack, ed.), Vol. I: Der Kreis als Ganzes, Husum 1986, pp. 284–296.

External links

Krupp K5 information for modellers.

280 mm artillery
Railway guns
World War II artillery of Germany
Krupp
Military equipment introduced from 1940 to 1944